The Consulate General of the Republic of Poland in New York City is a consular mission of the Republic of Poland in the United States. It was inaugurated in 1919. The consulate is located in the Joseph Raphael De Lamar House at 233 Madison Avenue, New York City, New York. The Consul General of the Republic of Poland in New York is Adrian Kubicki.

History
On August 14, 1919, the Consulate General of the Republic of Poland in New York City was inaugurated. It was the first mission of Poland to be established in the United States.

In July 1945, Consul General Sylwin Strakacz repudiated the new communist Polish Provisional Government of National Unity, and resigned his post.

In December 1972 Poland purchased the Joseph Raphael De Lamar House at 233 Madison Avenue in Manhattan in New York City, New York, and reestablished the consulate at this location.

Consuls General of the Republic of Poland in New York City

Second Polish Republic 
1919 – Konstanty Buszczyński, Consul General
1919–1920 – Jerzy Barthel de Weydenthal, Consul
1920 – Zdzisław Kurnikowski, Consul
1920–1925 – Stefan Ludwik Grotowski, Consul General
1925–1928 – Sylwester Gruszka, Consul General
1928 – Tadeusz Marynowski, Consul
1928–1929 – Eugeniusz Rozwadowski, Consul General
1929–1935 – Mieczysław Marchlewski, Consul General
1935 – Jerzy Matusiński, Consul General
1935–1940 – Sylwester Gruszka, Consul General
1941–1945 – Sylwin Strakacz, Consul General

Polish People's Republic
1945–1947 – Eugeniusz Rozwadowski, acting head of the Consulate
1947–1953 – Jan Galewicz
1954–1959 – activities suspended
1970 – re-establishment of the General Consulate
1970–1974 – Kazimierz Ciaś
1975–1978 – Zbigniew Dembowski
1979 – Maksymilian Służewski, Consul
1979–1981 – Kazimierz Ciaś
1981–1985 – Waldemar Lipka-Chudzik
1985–1989 – Andrzej Olszówka

Third Polish Republic

1990–1996 – Jerzy Surdykowski
1997–2001 – Dariusz Jadowski
2001–2005 – Agnieszka Magdziak-Miszewska
2005–2010 – Krzysztof Kasprzyk
2010–2014 – Ewa Junczyk-Ziomecka
2014–2016 – Urszula Gacek
2017–2019 – Maciej Golubiewski
2020–present – Adrian Kubicki

See also
Poland – United States relations
List of diplomatic missions of Poland
Foreign relations of Poland
Polish nationality law

References

External links
Consulate General of the Republic of Poland in New York 

1919 establishments in New York City
New York City
Poland–United States relations
Polish-American culture in New York City
Poland
Madison Avenue
Murray Hill, Manhattan